Brotia citrina is a species of freshwater snail with an operculum, an aquatic gastropod mollusk in the family Pachychilidae.

Distribution 
This species occurs in Thailand.

References

External links 

Gastropods described in 1868
citrina